Chris Korda (born 1962) is an American antinatalist activist, techno musician, software developer, and leader of the Church of Euthanasia.

Personal life 
Korda is the daughter of Michael Korda and his first wife, Carolyn Keese. She is the granddaughter of art director Vincent Korda, and the great-niece of film directors Alexander Korda and Zoltan Korda.

Korda has identified as transgender since 1991, and is vegan. She is a graduate of the Hammonasset School.

Unabomber for President 

In 1995, Korda, together with Lydia Eccles, launched the campaign Unabomber for President. It took the overt form of a political action committee, Unabomber Political Action Committee (UNAPACK). The group supported the arguments set forth in the Unabomber Manifesto, but not Ted Kaczynski himself.

Software career 
In 2008, Korda designed Fractice, a fractal renderer.

Korda is also an inventor of music software, such as Waveshop (2013), a bit-perfect lossless free audio editor.

She is also the creator of ChordEase (2014), a free software tool that is compatible with any MIDI instrument and makes notes easier to play. ChordEase was presented at the 2015 International Conference on New Interfaces for Musical Expression.

Music career 
As an electronic/techno musician, Korda has released several LPs, singles and EPs. Korda toured Europe with her album Man of the Future, released in 2003 by the German electronic music record label International Deejay Gigolo Records. Korda has toured worldwide and uses her own software to perform live, including at the 2001 Sonar music festival in Barcelona.

Selected discography

Albums 
 1999: Six Billion Humans Can't Be Wrong (DJ Mix; as Chris Korda & The Church Of Euthanasia; International Deejay Gigolos)
 2003: The Man Of The Future (International Deejay Gigolo Records)
 2004: Victim Of Leisure – Live @ BURN.FM (Platoniq)
 2019: Akoko Ajeji (Perlon)
 2020: Polymeter (Mental Groove Records)
 2020: Apologize To The Future (Perlon)

Singles and EPs 
 1993: Save The Planet, Kill Yourself (Kevorkian Records)
 1997: Save The Planet, Kill Yourself (Re-Release; International Deejay Gigolos)
 1998: Sex Is Good (International Deejay Gigolos)
 2002: I Like To Watch (Null Records)
 2002: When It Rains EP (International Deejay Gigolos)
 2003: The Man Of The Future (International Deejay Gigolos)	
 2020: Magic Cookie EP (Partout)

External links 
 Church of Euthanasia
 Chris Korda's blog
 
 
 Podcast with Chris Korda for Radio Web MACBA, 2021

References 

1962 births
Living people
American people of Hungarian-Jewish descent
American techno musicians
Anti-natalists
Euthanasia activists
LGBT people from New York (state)
Transgender women musicians
Transgender Jews
LGBT DJs
Transgender musicians
Transgender writers
American women in electronic music
American people of English descent
21st-century LGBT people